The S-class submarines of the Royal Navy were originally designed and built during the modernisation of the submarine force in the early 1930s to meet the need for smaller boats to patrol the restricted waters of the North Sea and the Mediterranean Sea, replacing the British H-class submarines. As part of the major naval construction for the Royal Navy during the Second World War, the S class became the single largest group of submarines ever built for the Royal Navy. A total of 62 were constructed over a period of 15 years, with fifty of the "improved" S class being launched between 1940 and 1945.

Service
The submarines operated in the waters around the United Kingdom and in the Mediterranean, and later in the Far East after being fitted with extra tankage.

After the war S-class boats continued to serve in the Royal Navy until the 1960s.

Several S-class submarines were sold on or lent to other navies:
Netherlands 1
Portugal    3
France      4
Israel      2. (HMS Springer as INS Tanin (S71), landed commandos and fought with an Egyptian ship in the Six-Day War)

Service losses

Of the twelve S-class boats that were in service in 1939, only three survived to see the end of World War II, a loss rate that inspired the song "Twelve Little S-Boats", based on a nursery rhyme originally written by Septimus Winner in 1868.

Twelve little S-boats "go to it" like Bevin,
Starfish goes a bit too far — then there were eleven.
Eleven watchful S-boats doing fine and then
Seahorse fails to answer — so there are ten.
Ten stocky S-boats in a ragged line,
Sterlet drops and stops out — leaving us nine.
Nine plucky S-boats, all pursuing Fate,
Shark is overtaken — now we are eight.
Eight sturdy S-boats, men from Hants and Devon,
Salmon now is overdue — and so the number's seven.
Seven gallant S-boats, trying all their tricks,
Spearfish tries a newer one — down we come to six.
Six tireless S-boats fighting to survive,
No reply from Swordfish — so we tally five.
Five scrubby S-boats, patrolling close inshore,
Snapper takes a short cut — now we are four.
Four fearless S-boats, too far out to sea,
Sunfish bombed and scrap-heaped — we are only three.
Three threadbare S-boats patrolling o'er the blue,
...
Two ice-bound S-boats...
...
One lonely S-boat...
...

The survivors, left blank in the fatalistic rhyme, were HMS Sealion (scuttled), HMS Seawolf (broken up), and HMS Sturgeon (sold).

General characteristics

First group 

The first group of S-class submarines consisted of four boats. They were smaller and slower than later classes, and carried less armament, but could be crewed by fewer men.  All four were built at Chatham Dockyard, between 1930 and 1932.  During the war, they operated in home waters, particularly the English Channel, and off the Scandinavian coast.  The later second and third groups of S-class submarines would have their fuel capacity expanded to allow them to operate further and overcome this limitation.

The mortality rate of these early boats was particularly high.  Only one, HMS Sturgeon, survived to the end of the war.

Ships:

Two ordered under the 1929 Construction Programme:
 HMS Swordfish
 HMS Sturgeon
Two ordered under the 1930 Construction Programme:
 HMS Seahorse
 HMS Starfish

Second group 

The second group of S-class submarines consisted of eight boats.  They were larger than the preceding first group and required more men to crew, but carried a similar armament.  Construction was divided between Chatham Dockyard, and the yards of Scotts, of Greenock and Cammell Laird & Co Limited, of Birkenhead.  All the ships were built between 1934 and 1937.  During the war, they, like the submarines of the first group, mostly operated in home waters, ranging as far afield as the Bay of Biscay and the Scandinavian coast.  One, HMS Sunfish, was assigned to the Soviet Navy (named V-1) and was sunk by friendly aircraft on the transfer route from Dundee to Murmansk.

A large percentage of these submarines were also lost during the war.  Only two, HMS Sealion and HMS Seawolf, survived to the end of the war.

Ships:

Two ordered under the 1931 Construction Programme:
 HMS Sealion
 HMS Shark
Two ordered under the 1932 Construction Programme:
 HMS Snapper
 HMS Salmon
One ordered under the 1933 Construction Programme:
 HMS Seawolf
Two ordered under the 1934 Construction Programme:
 HMS Spearfish
 HMS Sunfish
One ordered under the 1935 Construction Programme:
 HMS Sterlet

Third group 

The third and by far the most numerous group of S-class submarines consisted of 50 boats. They were the largest and most heavily armed of the S class and required more men to crew.  They were one knot faster on the surface, but two knots slower when submerged. Most of the group were built at the yards of either Scotts, of Greenock or Cammell Laird & Co Limited, of Birkenhead, with a handful being built at Chatham, or by Vickers Armstrongs Ltd, of Barrow-in-Furness. Construction was carried out throughout the war, particularly between 1941 and 1945.  Equipped with a greater fuel capacity than their predecessors, they operated much further afield, in the Mediterranean and in the Pacific.

There were two distinct subgroups. The first were boats of 842 tons, comprising those ordered under the 1939 War Emergency, 1940 and 1941 Programmes (except Sea Devil and Scotsman), plus Sturdy and Stygian of the 1942 Programme; these carried an external stern torpedo tube in addition to the six bow tubes. The second subgroup were boats of 814 tons, comprising Sea Devil and Scotsman of the 1941 Programme, plus those ordered under the 1942 and 1943 Programmes (except Sturdy and Stygian); these carried no external torpedo tube, but had a thicker welded pressure hull providing for an operational depth limit of  - compared with the  limit in the first subgroup.

Losses continued to be high. Nine ships; P222, Saracen, Sahib, Sickle, Simoom, Splendid, Stonehenge, Stratagem and Syrtis were lost during the war, and Shakespeare and Strongbow were so badly damaged that they were written off and scrapped. Many surviving ships remained in service after the war.  Sportsman, by now transferred to the French Navy, was lost off Toulon in 1952 and Sidon was sunk after a torpedo malfunction in 1955.

Ships:

Five ships were ordered under the 1939 War Emergency Programme.
 HMS Safari
 HMS Sahib
 HMS Saracen
 HMS Satyr
 HMS Sceptre
Twenty ships were ordered under the 1940 Programme. These differed from the initial five by having an external stern torpedo tube fitted, also a 20 mm Oerlikon AA gun and air warning RDF installed.
 HMS Seadog
 HMS Sibyl
 HMS Sea Rover
 HMS Seraph
 HMS Shakespeare
 HMS P222 which was lost before a name could be allotted to her.
 HMS Sea Nymph
 HMS Sickle
 HMS Simoom
 HMS Sirdar
 HMS Spiteful
 HMS Splendid
 HMS Sportsman
 The final seven further ships (P81 to P87) ordered under the 1940 Programme, all from Vickers-Armstrongs, were cancelled during 1943 (and were never laid down or named).
Fifteen ships were ordered under the 1941 Programme.
 HMS Stoic
 HMS Stonehenge
 HMS Storm
 HMS Stratagem
 HMS Strongbow
 HMS Spark
 
 HMS Stubborn
 HMS Surf
 HMS Syrtis
 HMS Shalimar
 HMS Scotsman
 HMS Sea Devil
 HMS Spirit
 HMS Statesman
Thirteen ships were ordered under the 1942 Programme.
 HMS Sturdy
 
 HMS Subtle
 HMS Supreme
 HMS Sea Scout
 HMS Selene
 HMS Seneschal
 HMS Sentinel
 HMS Sidon
 HMS Sleuth
 HMS Solent
 HMS Spearhead
Eight ships were ordered under the 1943 Programme, but only four were completed. The other four submarines was cancelled after the war ended in 1945, and they became surplus to peacetime requirements.
 HMS Saga
 HMS Scorcher
 HMS Spur
 HMS Sanguine – sold to Israel, recommissioned August 1959 as INS Rahav
 HMS Sea Robin (P267) – cancelled
 HMS Sprightly (P268) – cancelled
 HMS Surface (P269) – cancelled
 HMS Surge (P271) – cancelled

Ships in foreign service
Several S-class submarines were sold on or lent to other navies.
From the First group:
In 1943 HMS Sturgeon was transferred to the Royal Netherlands Navy as Zeehond. She was returned in 1945

From the Second group
In 1944 HMS Sunfish was transferred to the Soviet Navy (and renamed V-1); she was sunk in a friendly fire incident while on transfer to Murmansk.

From the Third group
In 1948 three submarines were transferred to Portugal
 HMS Spearhead became Neptuno
 HMS Saga became Nautilo
 HMS Spur became Narval
In 1952 four submarines were transferred to France and were known as the Saphir class
 HMS Satyr became Saphir
 HMS Spiteful became Sirene
 HMS Sportsman became Sibylle but was lost in a diving accident in September 1952
 HMS Statesman became Sultane
In 1959 two submarines were sold to Israel
 HMS Springer became INS Tanin and saw action during the Six Day War
 HMS Sanguine became INS Rahav

In popular media 

A fictional third generation S-class submarine, HMS Saraband is the main setting of the sixth "Harry Gilmour" novel, Never Too Old For A Pierhead Jump by author David Black.

See also 

List of submarines of France

References

Sources

 

S class submarine, British, 1931
 
S class submarine